The following is a comparison of instant messaging protocols. It contains basic general information about the protocols.

Table of instant messaging protocols

See also
Comparison of cross-platform instant messaging clients
Comparison of Internet Relay Chat clients
Comparison of LAN messengers
LAN messenger
Secure instant messaging
 Comparison of user features of messaging platforms

References 

Instant messaging protocols
Instant messaging
Instant messaging protocols
Instant messaging protocols